Horsfieldia wallichii is a species of plant in the family Myristicaceae. It is found in Indonesia, Malaysia, and Singapore.

References

wallichii
Least concern plants
Flora of Malesia
Taxonomy articles created by Polbot